Anbar Tappeh (also Romanized as Anbār Tappeh) is a village in Aq Altin Rural District, in the Central District of Aqqala County, Golestan Province, Iran. At the 2006 census, its population was 733, in 160 families.

References 

Populated places in Aqqala County